A list of Principals of Green Templeton College, Oxford. The head of Green Templeton College, University of Oxford is called the Principal. This article also includes the heads of the predecessor institutions of the college, Green College and Templeton College. The current principal is Denise Lievesley, since October 2015.

Wardens of Green College
 Sir Richard Doll (1979–1983)
 John Walton, Baron Walton of Detchant (1983–1989)
 Trevor Hughes (1989–1990); acting Warden
 Sir Crispin Tickell (1990–1997)
 Sir John Hanson (1998–2005)
 Colin Bundy (2006–2008)

Presidents of Templeton College
1980–91: Dr Uwe Kitzinger
1991–92: Roger Undy (acting)
1991–96: Dr Clark Brundin
1996–97: Dr Michael von Clemm
1998–2002: Sir David Rowland
2002–04: Richard Greenhalgh 
2004–08: Professor Michael Earl

Principals of Green Templeton College
 Colin Bundy (2008–2010)
 Sir David Watson (2010–2015)
 Denise Lievesley (2015–2020)
 Sir Michael Dixon (2020–present)

References

 
 
 
Green Templeton
Green Templeton